Welch Foods Inc., commonly known as Welch's, is an American company, headquartered in Concord, Massachusetts. It has been owned by the National Grape Cooperative Association, a co-op of grape growers, since 1956. Welch's is particularly known for its grape juices, jams and jellies made from dark Concord grapes and its white Niagara grape juice. The company also manufactures and markets an array of other products, including refrigerated juices, frozen and shelf-stable concentrates, organic grape juice, fruit snacks, and dried fruit. Welch's has also licensed its name for a line of grape-flavored soft drinks since 1974. Welch's grape and strawberry soda flavors are currently licensed to Global Beverage Corporation. Other popular products that use the Welch's name are the fruit snacks made by The Promotion In Motion Companies, Inc.

History
The company was founded in Vineland, New Jersey, in 1869 by teetotal dentist Thomas Bramwell Welch and his son Charles Welch.

In 1956, the company was sold to the 'National Grape Cooperative Association', which comprises 1,300 grape growers located in Michigan, New York, Ohio, Pennsylvania, Maryland, Washington and Ontario, Canada.

In the 1960s, Welch's was a major sponsor of the ABC primetime animated comedy series The Flintstones; its characters were prominently featured in Welch's TV commercials on that show, and on jars of Welch's grape jelly which could be used as a drinking glass after the product had been fully used. In the early 1970s, The Archies cartoon characters were on the jars.

Physical plant
The oldest extant structure associated with the company is Welch Factory Building No. 1, located at Westfield, New York, and listed on the National Register of Historic Places in 1983. Their largest manufacturing plant is located 17 miles away in North East, Pennsylvania.

History of Welch's Grape Juice 
The method of pasteurizing grape juice to halt the fermentation has been attributed to a British–American physician and dentist, Thomas Bramwell Welch (1825–1903) in 1869. Welch was an adherent to the Wesleyan Methodist Connexion which strongly opposed "manufacturing, buying, selling, or using intoxicating liquors" and advocated the use of unfermented grape juice instead of wine for administering 'communion', during the church service.  A few years earlier, Welch had relocated to Vineland, New Jersey, a town started in 1861 by Philadelphia land developer Charles K. Landis (1833–1900) to create his own alcohol-free utopian society, a "Temperance Town" based on agriculture and progressive thinking. Landis declared that he was "about to build a city, and an agricultural and fruit-growing colony around it." The population reached 5,500 by 1865.  Landis determined the potential in growing grapes and named the settlement "Vineland", and advertised to attract Italian grape growers to Vineland, offering 20 acres (81,000 m2) of land that had to be cleared and used to grow grapes.  Welch had moved to the region following his sister who was one of Vineland's earliest residents and began to produce an "unfermented wine" (grape juice) from locally grown grapes that was marketed as "Dr. Welch's Unfermented Wine".  This product became "Welch's Grape Juice" in 1893 when Welch and his son Charles E. Welch (also a practicing dentist) had decided to incorporate in 1893 as the Welch's Grape Juice Company at Westfield, New York. The product was given to visitors at international exhibitions. The oldest extant structure associated with the company is Welch Factory Building No. 1, located at Westfield, and listed on the National Register of Historic Places in 1983.

As the temperance movement grew, so did the popularity of grape juice. In 1913, Secretary of State William Jennings Bryan served grape juice instead of wine during a full-dress diplomatic function, and in 1914, Josephus Daniels, Secretary of the Navy, forbade any alcoholic drinks on board naval ships, actively replacing them with grape juice. During World War I, the company supplied "grapelade", a type of grape jam, to the military and advertised aggressively. Subsequent development of new grape products and sponsorship of radio and television programs made the company very successful.

Current products
Welch's produces a variety of juices, jellies/jams, and fruit snacks.

Juices

100% Juices
 Concord Grape
 Concord Grape with Calcium
 Concord Grape with Fiber
 Red Grape
 White Grape
 White Grape Cherry
 White Grape Peach
 Black Cherry Concord Grape
 Apple
 Pineapple Apple
 Orange

Juice Drinks
 Fruit Punch
 Mango Twist
 Orange Pineapple Apple
 Peach Medley
 Cranberry Juice Cocktail
 Apple Cranberry
 Grape
 Passion Fruit
 Mango Passion Fruit
 Mango Pineapple
 Orange Pineapple
 Strawberry Kiwi
 Tropical Carrot

Refrigerated Juices
 Concord Grape
 Passion Fruit
 Berry Pineapple Passion Fruit
 Guava Pineapple
 Mountain Berry
 Mango Twist
 Dragon Fruit Mango
 Watermelon Lemonade

Diet and Light Juices
 Diet Concord Grape
 Diet Cranberry Grape
 Light Concord Grape

Sparkling Juices

 Sparkling Red Grape
 Sparkling White Grape 
 Sparling Rosé Grape
 Sparkling Cider
 Sparkling Sangria
 Sparkling Strawberry Daiquiri

Jellies/jams
 Concord Grape Jelly
 Concord Grape Jam
 Natural Concord Grape Spread
 Reduced Sugar Concord Grape Jelly
 Strawberry Spread
 Natural Strawberry Spread

Snacks
 Fruit Snacks
 Juicefuls
 Fruit 'n Yogurt
 Fresh Fruit
 Organic Juice Ice Bar
 Sparkling Soda
 Slush Pouch (Concord Berry, Concord Grape, White Grape Cherry, and White Grape Peach)
 Protein Smoothies
 Gelatin (Grape and Strawberry Peach)

Advertising
Welch's long-time traditional advertising partner is The Via Agency in Portland, Maine and in the Fall of 2016 announced that Jack Morton Worldwide's Genuine group will be handling the mobile, social, and digital media and strategy. The company is looking to reach consumers on digital channels with advertising aimed at informing about Welch's products, ingredients, and the company's long heritage.

Welch's has featured people in their television commercials such as:
 Travis Tedford
 Emily Mae Young
 Isla Ng
 Shyann McClure
 Alton Brown

References

External links

 Welch's company homepage
 Welch's soft drink page
 National Grape Cooperative Association

Agricultural marketing cooperatives
Drink brands
Companies based in Middlesex County, Massachusetts
Companies established in 1869
Food manufacturers of the United States
Vineland, New Jersey
1869 establishments in New Jersey
Food and drink companies established in 1869
Agricultural cooperatives in the United States
Grape juice